"Higher" is a song by American rock band Creed. It was released on August 31, 1999, as the lead single from their second studio album, Human Clay. The song became the bands breakthrough hit as it was their first song to reach the top ten on the US Billboard Hot 100 where it peaked at number seven in July 2000. It spent a total of 57 weeks upon the survey, the longest stay for any Creed song on the Hot 100. "Higher" also became the band's second chart-topping hit on rock radio as it topped both the Modern Rock and Mainstream Rock charts, for a then-record of 17 weeks.

Writing and recording
According to an interview with Loudwire, in an episode of "Wikipedia: Fact Or Fiction", Mark Tremonti revealed that the song was a culmination of improvising live onstage. During their earliest shows, vocalist Scott Stapp would placate the audience by goading his bandmates to come up with a song live on the spot. Scott was the first to begin playing the drum set piece, with Mark later entering the chord progression associated with the song. After reviewing the tapes of the show, as they had always recorded their performances for later review, they decided that the song was worth working out in the studio.

Music and lyrics
Vocalist Scott Stapp and long-time friend Steven Harang wrote the song about the power of lucid dreaming. In another episode of Loudwire's "Wikipedia: Fact Or Fiction?" Stapp stated that the inspiration for the song came from a recurring dream that he had. In the endlessly present nightmare, Stapp would be hunted down and killed by an unknown assailant brandishing a firearm. Once he took up studying lucid dreaming, he was able to escape the gunman, and subsequently wrote the song as a memento towards the dream.

Musically the song has an anthemic and uplifting sound, often drawing comparisons to one of the bands later hit singles, My Sacrifice. The song is written in the key of D major, with Tremonti playing in drop D tuning and Stapp singing in baritone. "Higher" has been described as post-grunge, hard rock and alternative rock.

Music video
The video begins with the band sitting backstage before heading out to perform the song in front of an audience on stage. The video features slow motion and pause scenes of the band and the crowd, along with Stapp hanging in mid-air with his arms out while wearing his signature leather pants. At the end of the video, the camera pans back to the band backstage as they are seen once again walking to the stage to perform as they did at the beginning of the video, leaving the viewer to wonder if the original live performance was a dream or not. Director Ramaa Mosley, who also directed the video for "What's This Life For", recalls coming up with the idea after listening to the song with the record label. The first idea she had was of an epic performance that is later questioned to have ever happened. It was the only idea she pitched for the video.

The music video was shot in Orlando, Florida, at the Hard Rock Cafe Orlando. According to Mosley, filming the video was a "creative struggle", as Creed had only a short time to shoot the video before they went on tour in Japan. Over 300 extras were used in the video as members of the audience as well as the people seen with the band backstage. For the pause scenes, Mosley had the band and the audience freeze while the camera rotated around them, and also used multiple cameras set up around the band that were then joined with hovering objects added later in post-production. Cables were also used for scenes where Stapp is hovering over the audience. For the final scene, a 360 degree photography spin technique is used, a relatively new technique at the time, which required an array of cameras and sophisticated software to interpolate the still images into what appears to be one continuous shot of Stapp and the band backstage before heading off to play on stage.

Stapp himself has stated that he is embarrassed by the video and that it has not aged well. During a 2017 interview with GQ, Stapp said in regard to the video that "Sometimes I cringe when I see it. Like, 'What was I thinking? Look at those pants.'"

Release and reception
Released as the lead single to the bands sophomore album, Human Clay, "Higher" would prove to be Creed's major breakthrough hit when it peaked at number seven on the US Billboard Hot 100 on the issue dated July 22, 2000. It spent a total of 57 weeks upon the survey, which is the longest stay for any Creed song on the Hot 100, and finished on the Hot 100 year end chart for 2000 at number 11.  Furthermore, it topped both the Modern Rock and Mainstream Rock tallies in the process, which gave the band their fifth consecutive chart-topping hit on rock radio. "Higher" remained in the top spot on the Mainstream Rock chart for a then-record of 17 weeks until it was surpassed by 3 Doors Down's song "Loser". The song would finish at number 4 on both the Mainstream and Modern Rock year end charts for 2000. It also charted in the top five on the Adult Top 40 chart. Internationally the song topped the UK Rock and Metal (OCC) chart for four weeks in early 2000, and also peaked at number two on the Canada Rock/Alternative (RPM) chart. To promote the Human Clay album, the band also released a free digital download of "Higher" a full month before the records release. On May 10, 2019, nearly 20 years after its original release, the song was given gold status by the Recording Industry Association of America (RIAA) for sales of over 500,000 certified digital units.

"Higher" placed at number 95 on VH1's "100 Greatest Hard Rock Songs" in 2009. It won the Song of the Year award at the 2000 My VH1 Music Awards,
and was also nominated for the Best Rock Video award at the 2000 MTV Video Music Awards, but lost to Limp Bizkit's "Break Stuff".

Higher EP

Charts

Weekly charts

Year-end charts

Certifications

Release history

Appearance in media
 "Higher" appeared in the films The Skulls and 22 Jump Street. The song had also appeared in some of the official trailers for Titan A.E..
 The book The Ishbane Conspiracy mentions the song.
 The song was performed live on the November 16, 1999, episode of Late Night with David Letterman, the 2000 Billboard Music Awards, the 2001 Blockbuster Entertainment Awards and the April 23, 2010, episode of The Tonight Show with Jay Leno.
 "Higher" was performed as part of a medley, which also included  "Don't Stop Dancing" and "My Sacrifice", during the bands performance at the halftime show at the 2001 Dallas Cowboys' annual Thanksgiving Day football game on November 22, 2001
 "Higher" was used for the closing video package at the 2nd annual WWE Tribute to the Troops professional wrestling event in 2004. 
 The song was released as downloadable content for the music video games Rocksmith 2014 and Rock Band 2.
 In the film Neighbors, the fraternity boys of Delta Psi sang the first sentence from the chorus during the meeting after reciting their version of Sigma Nu's creed.

See also
 List of Billboard Mainstream Rock number-one songs of the 1990s
 List of Billboard number-one alternative singles of the 1990s

References

1990s ballads
1999 singles
1999 songs
Creed (band) songs
Rock ballads
Songs about dreams
Songs written by Mark Tremonti
Songs written by Scott Stapp
Wind-up Records singles